Tuzar Skipper (born June 5, 1995) is an American football outside linebacker for the Seattle Sea Dragons of the XFL. He played college football at the University of Toledo.

College career
Skipper played college football for Monroe College from 2014 to 2015 and for Toledo from 2016 to 2018. In 2014 and 2015, he was named to the All-NEFC second-team. In 2018, he was named to the All-MAC third-team.

Professional career

Pittsburgh Steelers
Skipper was signed by the Pittsburgh Steelers as an undrafted free agent in 2019. After making the Steelers initial 53-man roster, Skipper was waived prior to Week 1 on September 7, 2019.

New York Giants
On September 9, 2019, Skipper was claimed off waivers by the New York Giants. He was waived on October 22, 2019, and re-signed to the practice squad.

Pittsburgh Steelers (second stint)
On November 19, 2019, Skipper was re-signed by the Steelers off the Giants practice squad. On December 30, Skipper was re-signed by the Steelers to a two-year contract. He was waived on September 5, 2020.

Tennessee Titans
Skipper was signed to the Tennessee Titans' practice squad on September 15, 2020. He was elevated to the active roster on November 21, November 28, December 5, and December 12 for the team's weeks 11, 12, 13, and 14 games against the Baltimore Ravens, Indianapolis Colts, Cleveland Browns, and Jacksonville Jaguars, and reverted to the practice squad after each game. He was placed on the practice squad/injured list on December 15, 2020, and restored to the practice squad on January 6, 2021.

He was signed to a futures contract by the Titans on January 11, 2021.  Skipper was waived by Tennessee on July 25, 2021.

Atlanta Falcons
On July 31, 2021, Skipper signed with the Atlanta Falcons. He was waived on August 31, 2021.

Tennessee Titans
On December 6, 2021, Skipper was signed to the Tennessee Titans practice squad. After the Titans were eliminated in the Divisional Round of the 2021 playoffs, he signed a reserve/future contract on January 24, 2022. He was waived on May 2, 2022.

Pittsburgh Steelers (third stint)
On June 1, 2022, Skipper signed with the Pittsburgh Steelers. He was waived/injured on August 15, 2022. He reverted to injured reserve the following day. He was released on August 24, 2022.

Seattle Sea Dragons 
On November 17, 2022, Skipper was drafted by the Seattle Sea Dragons of the XFL.

References

External links
Toledo bio

1995 births
Living people
American football linebackers
Atlanta Falcons players
New York Giants players
Pittsburgh Steelers players
Players of American football from Connecticut
Seattle Sea Dragons players
Sportspeople from Norwich, Connecticut
Tennessee Titans players
Toledo Rockets football players
Monroe Mustangs football players